Birch Evans Bayh Sr. (September 29, 1893 – August 26, 1971) was an American basketball and baseball coach.  He was the head basketball coach at Indiana State University from 1918 to 1923.  During this time, he also served as the head baseball coach, athletic director and professor of physical education.  He was also instrumental in the establishment of the Indiana Intercollegiate Conference; additionally, he served as the first secretary-treasurer of that organization.

Life and career
Bayh was born in Quincy, Indiana, the son of Mettie/Nettie (née Evans) and Frederick C. "Fred" Bayh. His paternal grandparents were German immigrants.

Bayh led the Sycamores to their first fifteen-win season and their first twenty-win season.  Bayh's .640 winning percentage at Indiana State currently ranks him as the sixth-winningest coach in the school's history.

He began his career as a teacher and coach in the public schools of Owen and Clay counties of Indiana; he later became director of physical education of the Terre Haute, Indiana, public school system and later held the same position for the Washington, D.C., public school system.  He was a long-time high school basketball official in Indiana and officiated ten state championship games, a record that he still holds today.

He was a World War I veteran, reaching the rank of Major and held an exercise certificate (an associate degree) from the North American Gymnastics Union of Indianapolis.

A second-generation alumnus of Indiana State, he was the father of former U.S. Senator Birch Bayh and Mary Alice Feather, and the grandfather of former Indiana Governor and former U.S. Senator Evan Bayh and Christopher Bayh.  In 2009, Indiana State renamed its School of Education the "Bayh School of Education" to honor the Bayh family.

Head coaching record

Basketball

Baseball

References

External links
 

1893 births
1971 deaths
Basketball coaches from Indiana
American people of German descent
American people of English descent
American people of Scotch-Irish descent
American people of Scottish descent
Indiana State Sycamores athletic directors
Indiana State Sycamores men's basketball coaches
Indiana State Sycamores baseball coaches
People from Owen County, Indiana
Bayh family
American military personnel of World War I